Aruba participated at the 2018 Summer Youth Olympics in Buenos Aires, Argentina from 6 to 18 October 2018.

Beach volleyball

Aruba qualified a boys' and girls' team based on their performance at the 2018 CAZOVA Zone U19 Championship.

 Boys' tournament – 1 team of 2 athletes
 Girls' tournament – 1 team of 2 athletes

Swimming

Girls

Tennis

Singles

Doubles

Triathlon

Individual

Relay

References

2018 in Aruba
Nations at the 2018 Summer Youth Olympics
Aruba at the Youth Olympics